Star Drama Theater Presents was an ABS-CBN Saturday program which featured a mix of veteran and upcoming stars from the Philippine entertainment industry from February 18, 1993, to September 8, 2001. The weekly program featured an actor for a thirteen week season. The program was developed from its predecessor, Star Drama Theater which focuses on monthly anthologies focused on one actor.

Various actors and actresses from Philippine Movies and TV get a special line up in this anthology with different stars in each month. The first featured star was Nora Aunor who was contracted to appear for one season.  Her stint was billed as a "TV comeback" after a brief hiatus. She and ex-husband Christopher De Leon did a notable episode which highly rated during its initial telecast.  After a 2-season stint of "Nora" the anthology moved on to featuring various stars ranging from award-winning actresses such as Elizabeth Oropesa, Dawn Zulueta, Lorna Tolentino, Agot Isidro; to younger actresses Aiko Melendez, Manilyn Reynes, Sheryl Cruz, Rica Peralejo, Rico Yan, Judy Ann Santos, Angelika dela Cruz, Jericho Rosales, Patrick Garcia, Jolina Magdangal, Carmina Villarroel, Claudine Barretto, Rica Peralejo, Jericho Rosales, Diether Ocampo, Dominic Ochoa and Donita Rose; and on the last years of the show it served as a venue for actors and actresses signed with Star Magic to showcase their thespic abilities.

This series is currently streaming on Jeepney TV YouTube Channel every last quarter of the month, 5:00 pm.

References

See also
List of shows previously aired by ABS-CBN
Maalaala Mo Kaya

1993 Philippine television series debuts
2001 Philippine television series endings
ABS-CBN original programming
Philippine anthology television series
Filipino-language television shows